Jerry Mofokeng (born 17 April 1956) is a South African stage and screen actor who has appeared in several critically acclaimed films, including Cry The Beloved Country; Lord of War; Mandela and de Klerk; and the 2005 Academy Award-winning film Tsotsi.

Mofokeng attended Orlando West High School and Youth Alive Ministries in Soweto in the 1970s. He studied at Wits Drama School where he initially took his major in acting then later went on to study at Columbia University in America, where he obtained his master's degree in Theatre Directing. At the age of 56 Mofokeng added his biological father's surname Makhetha) is a South African stage and screen and henceforth he became known as Jerry Mofokeng wa Makhetha after his biological father whom he knew all along but didn't know he was his biological father until the age of 56.

Filmography

Film

References

Living people
South African dramatists and playwrights
People from Soweto
South African male actors
University of the Witwatersrand alumni
Columbia University School of the Arts alumni
1956 births